Polls leading up to the 1993 Canadian federal election.

National polls

Campaign period

During the 34th Parliament of Canada

By geographic area

In the Atlantic provinces

In Québec

Campaign period

In 1993 (before the election campaign)

In 1989

In Ontario

In the Prairies

In Alberta

In British Columbia

Notes

References

External links

1993 Canadian federal election
1993 general election
Canada